Atul railway station is a small railway station on the Western Railway network in the state of Gujarat, India. Atul is 'E' category railway station of Western Railway. Atul railway station is 7 km  from Valsad railway station. Adjacent to Atul railway station is a coal yard. Passenger and MEMU trains halt here.

Western Railway AC Traction Sub-station is also located near Atul railway station.

Nearby stations 

 is nearest railway station towards Mumbai, whereas  is nearest railway station towards Surat.

Trains

 59023/24 Valsad–Mumbai Central Fast Passenger
 59037/38 Virar–Surat Passenger
 69149/50 Virar–Bharuch MEMU
 69141/42 Sanjan–Surat MEMU
 59439/40 Mumbai Central–Ahmedabad Passenger
 69153/54 Umargam Road–Valsad MEMU
 09072 Valsad–Vapi Passenger Special
 09069 Vapi–Surat Passenger Special
 69139 Borivali–Surat MEMU
 59039 Virar–Valsad Shuttle
 59046 Valsad–Bandra Terminus Passenger
 69140 Valsad–Virar MEMU

Notes

References

See also
 Valsad district

Railway stations in Valsad district
Mumbai WR railway division